The 2015–16 Washington Huskies men's basketball team represented the University of Washington in the 2015–16 NCAA Division I men's basketball season. The Huskies were led by fourteenth-year head coach Lorenzo Romar. They played their games at Alaska Airlines Arena at Hec Edmundson Pavilion as members of the Pac-12 Conference. They finished the season 19–15, 9–9 in Pac-12 play to finish in a three-way tie for sixth place. They defeated Stanford in the first round of the Pac-12 tournament to advance to the quarterfinals where they lost to Oregon. They were invited to the National Invitation Tournament where they defeated Long Beach State in the first round to advance to the second round where they lost to San Diego State.

Previous season
The 2014–15 Washington Huskies finished the season with an overall record of 16–15, and 5–13 in the Pac-12 conference play. Lost to Stanford in the first round of the Pac-12 tournament.

Departures

Incoming transfers

2015 recruiting class

2016 Recruiting class

Roster

Coaching staff

Schedule

Washington's basketball schedule featured a matchup with Texas in Shanghai, China. The Huskies were also invited to play in the Battle 4 Atlantis, where played against the 3 following teams in the Bahamas: Gonzaga, Texas, and Charlotte. Washington  also hosted TCU, Montana, Penn, and Oakland.

|-
!colspan=12 style="background:#363c74; color:#e8d3a2;"| Exhibition

|-
!colspan=12 style="background:#363c74; color:#e8d3a2;"| Non-conference regular season

|-
!colspan=12 style="background:#363c74;"| Pac-12 regular season

|-
!colspan=12 style="background:#363c74;"| Pac-12 Tournament

|-
!colspan=12 style="background:#363c74;"| NIT

See also
2015–16 Washington Huskies women's basketball team

References

Washington
Washington Huskies men's basketball seasons
Washington
Washington
Washington
Washington